The name Gert has been used for six tropical cyclones in the Atlantic Ocean.
 Hurricane Gert (1981) - caused heavy rainfall to several islands in the Caribbean but no significant damage.
 Hurricane Gert (1993) - formed near and later made landfall in Central America and then twice in Mexico, before existing the basin and moved to the eastern Pacific basin where it later dissipated.
 Hurricane Gert (1999) - reached Category 4 strength, threatened Bermuda before turning away.
 Tropical Storm Gert (2005) - made landfall near Tampico, Mexico.
 Tropical Storm Gert (2011) - formed in the open ocean, passed close to Bermuda, brushing the island with light rainfall. 
 Hurricane Gert (2017) - a Category 2 hurricane that did not cause any impact on land.

Atlantic hurricane set index articles